Leucoptera heringiella is a moth in the family Lyonetiidae that is found from Poland to North Macedonia, Bulgaria and in southern Russia.

The larvae feed on Chamaecytisus austriacus, Chamaecytisus ratisbonensis, Chamaecytisus supinus and Lembotropis nigricans. They mine the leaves of their host plant. The mine has the form of a round, flat, blotch without a trace of a preceding gallery. There is much granular frass, in indistinct concentric arcs. Pupation takes place outside of the mine.

References

Leucoptera (moth)
Moths described in 1938
Moths of Europe